Passage is the fifth studio album by the Texan rock band Bloodrock released on Capitol Records in November 1972.  Warren Ham (lead vocals/flute) was added in place of departed original members Jim Rutledge (lead vocals) and Lee Pickens (lead guitar).

Track listing
"Help Is on the Way" (Rick Cobb/Steve Hill) – 4:35
"Scottsman" (Nick Taylor/Steve Hill/Warren Ham) – 3:45
"Juice" (Hill/Ham) – 3:38
"The Power" (Mike Pietzsch) – 4:23
"Life Blood" (Cobb/Hill/Ham)– 5:38
"Days and Nights" (Hill/Ham)– 7:56
"Lost Fame" – (Hill/Ham)4:14
"Thank You Daniel Ellsberg" (Cobb/Hill)– 3:15
"Fantasy" (Hill/Ham)– 5:18

Notes
The song "Thank You Daniel Ellsberg" is a tribute to military analyst Daniel Ellsberg.

1972 albums
Bloodrock albums
Capitol Records albums